Eupithecia ravocostaliata, the tawny eupithecia or great variegated pug, is a moth in the family Geometridae. The species was first described by Alpheus Spring Packard in 1876. It is found in northern New York and the New England states, extending across Canada from the Maritime provinces to Vancouver Island and down the west coast as far as the San Francisco Bay region.

The wingspan is about 20 mm. The forewings have a pale, whitish ground colour with white and black costal and submarginal patches. Adults have been recorded on wing from January to August.

The larvae feed on the foliage of Rhamnus purshiana.

References

Moths described in 1876
ravocostaliata
Moths of North America